James Wilson (1814–1898) was a New Zealand farmer and politician. He was born in Prestwick, Ayrshire, Scotland in 1814. He was a member of the Southland Provincial Council representing the Waihopai electorate from 1861–1867 and again from 1869–1870, and the Waianiwa electorate from 1867–1869. He served on the Council's executive from 1869–1870 and was the Council's speaker from 1864 to 1869, and was briefly Deputy Superintendent from July to September 1870.

Notes

References

1814 births
1898 deaths
Members of the Southland Provincial Council
People from Prestwick
19th-century New Zealand politicians